Wipper can refer to:

Wipper (Saale), a river in Saxony-Anhalt, Germany, originating in the Harz
Wipper (Unstrut), a river in Thuringia, Germany
Wipper, the name of the river Wupper in its upper course
the German name for the river Wieprza in Poland
Wippra Dam also known as the Wipper Dam